Kéres Angelau Masangu (born 7 March 2000) is a Belgian professional footballer of Congolese descent, who plays as a midfielder for Virton.

Career

In 2017, Masangu joined the youth academy of Italian Serie A side Roma.

Before the second half of 2018/19, he was sent on loan to the youth academy of Sassuolo in Italy, where he suffered an injuries.

In 2020, he signed for Belgian club Beerschot.

Before the second half of 2020/21, Masangu signed for Šibenik in Croatia.

References

External links

 
 

Belgian footballers
Living people
Belgian expatriate sportspeople in Croatia
2000 births
Association football midfielders
HNK Šibenik players
Croatian Football League players
K Beerschot VA players
Footballers from Antwerp
Belgian expatriate sportspeople in Italy
Expatriate footballers in Croatia
Belgian expatriate footballers
Expatriate footballers in Italy
Belgian people of Republic of the Congo descent